Eisenstein in Guanajuato is a 2015 biographical romantic comedy-drama film written and directed by Peter Greenaway. Starring Elmer Bäck as Soviet film director Sergei Eisenstein, alongside Stelio Savante, Lisa Owen, Maya Zapata, Luis Alberti, Jakob Öhrman, Rasmus Slätis, and Raino Ranta, the film is an international co-production between companies in the Netherlands, Mexico, Belgium, Finland and France.

Cast

Release
Eisenstein in Guanajuato premiered at the 65th Berlin International Film Festival in the main competition section on 11 February 2015. The film was voted to the bottom place by the Screen International's critics’ jury and subsequently ignored by the official jury.

The film opened theatrically 18 June in the Netherlands, 8 July in France, 4 September in Finland, and 22 January 2016 in Mexico. It was granted a very limited theatrical release in the United States on 5 February 2016.

Critical reception
The film received mixed reviews from critics. On Rotten Tomatoes, the film has a 55% score based on 38 reviews, with an average rating of 6/10. The site's consensus states: "Eisenstein in Guanajuato is certainly bold, but its provocations aren't always enough to overcome a lack of depth and clear narrative purpose." Metacritic reports a 60 out of 100 rating based on 16 critics, indicating "mixed or average reviews".

Critic and author David Robinson praised Greenaway's "...own post-modern pictorialism still as ingenious, flashy and painstakingly wrought in his seventies." He also criticised the film heavily for its salaciousness and many historical inaccuracies, stating that of Eisenstein's wife Pera Atasheva and his many friends, confidants and colleagues: "None of these would recognise the Eisenstein they knew in Greenaway’s Guanajuato."

See also
 List of LGBT-related films of 2015

References

External links
 
 
 
 
 Berlinale 2015 film notes.

2015 films
2010s biographical films
2015 comedy-drama films
2015 LGBT-related films
English-language Dutch films
English-language Mexican films
English-language Belgian films
English-language Finnish films
English-language French films
2010s Spanish-language films
Dutch biographical films
Dutch comedy-drama films
Dutch LGBT-related films
Mexican biographical films
Mexican comedy-drama films
Mexican LGBT-related films
Belgian biographical films
Belgian comedy-drama films
Belgian LGBT-related films
Finnish biographical films
Finnish comedy-drama films
Finnish LGBT-related films
French biographical films
French comedy-drama films
French LGBT-related films
Films about communism
Films about film directors and producers
Films directed by Peter Greenaway
Films set in Mexico
Films shot in Finland
Films shot in Mexico
2010s English-language films
2010s British films
2010s French films
2010s Mexican films